was an unprotected cruiser of the Imperial Japanese Navy. The name Chishima (lit. "Thousand Islands") is the Japanese name for the Kurile Islands. Chishima was used by the Imperial Japanese Navy as an aviso (dispatch boat) for scouting, reconnaissance and delivery of high priority messages.

Background
Chishima was designed by French military advisor Émile Bertin, and built in the Ateliers et Chantiers de la Loire shipyards in Saint-Nazaire, France. It was part of the 1882 pre-First Sino-Japanese War expansion program of the Imperial Japanese Navy. In keeping with the Jeune Ecole philosophy of naval warfare advocated by Bertin, Chishima was small and lightly armed, so much so that sometimes Chishima has been confused with a torpedo gunboat or destroyer.

Design
Chishima was a slightly older design, which included a full barque rigging with three masts for auxiliary sail propulsion in addition to her steam engine. Chishima was armed with two  guns in sponsons on each side, with a fifth gun mounted in the bows. Secondary armament consisted of six  1-pounder guns mounted in pairs on the bridge, poop deck and one on each side. In addition, she carried five torpedo tubes, mounted on the deck.

Service record
The commissioning of Chishima was delayed by over a year, as the ship could achieve only , instead of the promised ; the French government agreed to pay the Japanese government some financial compensation for the issue. The shakedown cruise of Chishima was made on its voyage to Japan, with a crew of 80 Japanese and eleven French technicians, via Alexandria, the Suez Canal and Singapore. The ship suffered from numerous problems on this voyage, including boiler failure, leaks, and ruptured steam lines, before finally arriving at Nagasaki.

The larger merchant ship struck Chishima amidships, cutting her into two. Her captain and 74 sailors on board drowned, but  Ravenna suffered only minor damage. This incident led to the establishment of the Japanese "Maritime Anti-Collision Regulations".

One of the cannon of Chishima is preserved in a memorial at Aoyama Cemetery in Tokyo, and a memorial to the Chishima disaster with calligraphy by Tōgō Heihachirō is at the Buddhist temple of Jofuku-ji in Matsuyama.

Litigation following sinking
Afterwards, in a maritime tribunal held by the British consular court in Kobe, P&O was cleared. The Japanese Government then brought action against P&O in the British Court for Japan. P&O sought to file a counterclaim which the judge in the Court for Japan, Robert Mowat, rejected as not being within the jurisdiction of the court. P&O appealed to the British Supreme Court for China and Japan in Shanghai (Hannen CJ and Jamieson J) which allowed the counterclaim. The Japanese Government then appealed to the Judicial Committee of the Privy Council who allowed the appeal and held P&O was not allowed to counterclaim.

The case was remitted to the British Court for Japan for trial. P&O then settled the case by paying the Japanese government 10,000 pounds sterling in compensation, which corresponded roughly to the purchase cost of the ship, but provided for no compensation to the families of the lost officers and crew. The Japanese government had to bear its own legal costs. The British captain was not fined nor imprisoned for his responsibility in the incident. The settlement was regarded as highly unfair by the Japanese public, and was one issue cited in the drive for revision of the unequal treaties between Japan and the western nations to bring an end to extraterritoriality.

Notes

References

External links
Materials of the IJN
The Imperial Japanese Government v The Peninsular and Oriental Steam Navigation Company  1895 UKPC 33
Introduction to the Ravenna

Cruisers of the Imperial Japanese Navy
Ships built in France
1890 ships
Maritime incidents in 1892
Shipwrecks in the Inland Sea